Patrick Nasti (born 30 August 1989) is an Italian athlete competing primarily in the 3000 metres steeplechase.

Biography
He represented his country at the 2013 World Championships without qualifying for the final. In addition, he won the bronze at the 2013 Summer Universiade. His personal best in the event is 8:28.12, set in Huelva in 2014.

Personal bests
Outdoor
1000 metres – 2:33.54 (Trieste 2014)
1500 metres – 3:47.85 (Marcon 2012)
3000 metres – 8:06.11 (Velletri 2010)
5000 metres – 13:44.49 (Rovereto 2012)
10,000 metres – 33:27.39 (2007)
Half marathon – 1:06:17 (Aurisina 2013)
3000 metres steeplechase – 8:28.12 (Huelva 2014)

Indoor
3000 metres – 8:14.63 (Ancona 2011)

Achievements

References

External links
 

1989 births
Living people
Sportspeople from Trieste
Italian male steeplechase runners
Italian male long-distance runners
World Athletics Championships athletes for Italy
Universiade medalists in athletics (track and field)
Italian male cross country runners
Universiade bronze medalists for Italy
Medalists at the 2013 Summer Universiade
Athletes (track and field) at the 2013 Mediterranean Games
Mediterranean Games competitors for Italy